Robert Keith Dibble (born January 24, 1964) is an American former Major League Baseball (MLB) pitcher and television analyst. Between 1988 and 1995, Dibble played for the Cincinnati Reds, Chicago White Sox and Milwaukee Brewers. He was a two-time All-Star who recorded 89 saves during his career. Since retiring as a player, Dibble has held several roles in sports television broadcasting.

Personal life
Dibble was born in Bridgeport, Connecticut. He attended St. Thomas School, a parochial school, and is a graduate of Southington High School in Southington, Connecticut.  Dibble's father, Walt Dibble, was a longtime radio news director at WDRC and later WTIC in Hartford, Connecticut.

Playing career

Cincinnati Reds
Dibble was drafted by the Cincinnati Reds in the first round of the 1983 amateur draft, and he made his debut with the Reds on June 29, 1988.

On June 4, 1989, Dibble threw an immaculate inning when he struck out all three batters on nine total pitches, occurring in the eighth inning of a 5–3 win over the San Diego Padres.

Dibble was an MLB All-Star in 1990 and 1991, and was the 1990 NLCS Most Valuable Player (along with fellow "Nasty Boy" Randy Myers). In 1990, Dibble and the Reds won the World Series by beating the Oakland Athletics in four consecutive games.

Dibble recorded his 500th career strikeout in fewer innings—368—than any other pitcher in modern baseball history up to that point (a record that is currently held by Craig Kimbrel).

Temper
During his career, Dibble was known for his temper. During a game in July 1989, he hit Mets second basemen Tim Teufel in the back with a pitch; Teufel then charged Dibble, causing a benches clearing brawl. After saving a game in April 1991 despite giving up two runs in relief, Dibble threw a baseball 400 feet into the center-field seats at Cincinnati, inadvertently striking a woman. He was also involved in a brawl in 1991 with Astros shortstop Eric Yelding. Later in the 1991 season, he threw a baseball into the back of Cubs outfielder Doug Dascenzo as he ran down the first base line and was subsequently ejected from the game. Dibble also was involved in a brawl with manager Lou Piniella in the Reds clubhouse after a game in 1992.

Later career
Dibble required surgery to his pitching arm in 1994, and missed the entire season as a result. Dibble signed with the Chicago White Sox. They unsuccessfully tried to trade him in spring training so they sent him to their AAA team at Birmingham Al. where he went 0–2 in 11 games.  He then pitched 16 games for the White Sox and after being released he was picked up by the Milwaukee Brewers where he pitched in 15 more games. His combined MLB 1995 record was 1–2 with a 7.18 ERA with 46 batters walked in 21 innings.

Dibble opted to make a comeback, signing a minor league contract on April 14, 1996, with the Florida Marlins but Dibble would ultimately see no game action with the Marlins or their minor league affiliates.

Broadcasting career

In 1998, Dibble joined ESPN as a baseball analyst, working mostly on Dan Patrick's radio show. He worked on The Best Damn Sports Show Period as a co-host until 2008, when he left to join FOX on their Saturday baseball program as an analyst. Dibble also spends time as a co-host/analyst of First Pitch on XM Channel 175/Sirius channel 210. He formerly hosted The Show (on the same channel) with Jody McDonald. Dibble served as co-analyst (with Kevin Kennedy) for FOXSports.com on a weekly video segment entitled "Around the Bases." Dibble also is a co-host with former Major League player Denny Hocking on Fox Sports Radio Sunday night programming. In 2009, Dibble signed a three-year contract to replace Don Sutton as the color voice of the Washington Nationals on MASN.

While broadcasting a game in August 2010, Dibble drew negative attention for focusing on a group of female spectators in the Nationals crowd, and questioning their focus on the game.  He later apologized for the comments. Later in the month,  Dibble criticized Nationals rookie pitcher Stephen Strasburg for missing a start due to an injury: "Suck it up, kid. This is your profession. You chose to be a baseball player. You can't have the cavalry come in and save your butt every time you feel a little stiff shoulder, sore elbow."  It was revealed shortly afterward that Strasburg had torn an elbow ligament and required Tommy John surgery. Dibble took a few days off from MASN after making the comments, and on September 1, 2010, MASN announced that Dibble would no longer be calling Nationals games.  After losing his job with the Nationals, Dibble apologized for the Strasburg comments on his radio show.

In April 2011, Dibble said in an interview on FoxSports.com that the reason for his dismissal was because of an email Strasburg's father sent to the Lerner Family, the owners of the Nationals. Dibble also continued to express his belief that Strasburg should have pitched through his pain. Strasburg denied the claim about his father's e-mail, and Stan Kasten, the president of the Nationals,  called Dibble's account "fictional" and "sad". As of October 31, 2011, Dibble became a member of Mike North's talk radio show.

Dibble had a brief stint as the varsity baseball head coach at Calabasas High School in Calabasas, California. He was fired from his head coaching job on March 27, 2013, only ten games into the season. As of December 18, 2013, he, along with Amy Van Dyken, were replaced on Fox Sports Radio's Fox Sports Tonight.

Dibble also called games for the Los Angeles Angels for Compass Media.

On March 27, 2014, Dibble became the host of the 3–7 pm (Eastern) sports talk show on WUCS 97.9 FM and WAVZ 1300 AM in the ESPN stations in Hartford and New Haven, Connecticut respectively. He joined interim host Paul Nanos who filled in when Mike Bower's contract was not renewed. Up until the end of October the show was billed as The Rob Dibble Show with Paul Nanos. In October, the show was renamed The Rob Dibble Show.[26]

References

External links

1964 births
Living people
Sportspeople from Bridgeport, Connecticut
Cincinnati Reds players
Milwaukee Brewers players
Chicago White Sox players
National League All-Stars
American sports radio personalities
Major League Baseball broadcasters
Major League Baseball pitchers
Baseball players from Connecticut
Florida Southern Moccasins baseball players
Billings Mustangs players
Eugene Emeralds players
Tampa Tarpons (1957–1987) players
Cedar Rapids Reds players
Vermont Reds players
Violence in sports
Denver Zephyrs players
Nashville Sounds players
Indianapolis Indians players
Birmingham Barons players
New Orleans Zephyrs players
Washington Nationals announcers
Mid-Atlantic Sports Network
People from Calabasas, California
National League Championship Series MVPs
People from Southington, Connecticut